Kirby S. "Punk" Malone was a college football player and coach.

University of Georgia
Malone was a prominent guard and tackle for the Georgia Bulldogs football team of the University of Georgia. He had come from Stone Mountain University School and weighed 185 pounds.

1913
In 1913, Malone was selected All-Southern. Bob McWhorter and David Paddock were teammates.

Coaching career
Malone was an assistant coach under Frank B. Anderson (1919) and Jogger Elcock (1920) at Oglethorpe University.

References

Georgia Bulldogs football players
American football guards
Oglethorpe Stormy Petrels football coaches
All-Southern college football players
American football tackles